Dmitry Andreyevich Polyanski (born 19 November 1986 in Zheleznogorsk, Krasnoyarsk Krai), is a Russian professional triathlete, 2009 U23 European Champion and permanent member of the National Elite Team. Polyanski is, together with Alexander Bryukhankov and Ivan Vasiliev, qualified for the London Olympics 2012.

In 2003 Polyanski took part in his first ITU competition in Győr and was also awarded the title Master of Sports (Мастер спорта). In 2007 he won the Russian Championship and the World Championship in the team category in Tiszaújváros.
In 2009, Dmitry Polyanski won the bronze medal at the Russian Championships in Penza (Olympic Distance), in 2010 he gave precedence to the Elite Cup in Hy-Vee and did not take part in the competition in Penza.

In 2010, Polyanski also took part in the French Club Championship Series Lyonnaise des Eaux, representing the club Saint-Raphaël Tri.
At the first triathlon of this circuit in Dunkirk, Polyanski placed 5th and was the best triathlete of his club, which placed 5th in the club ranking. Incidentally, among the five triathletes representing Saint-Raphaël Tri there was not even one French triathlete, a situation which was allowed in the year 2010 by the Réglementation Sportive but will be forbidden from 2010/2011 on, and was practically impossible up to the previous season. At the triathlon in Tourangeaux (29 August 2010) Polyanski placed 5th and at the Grand Final in La Baule (Triathlon Audencia, 18 September 2010) he placed 32nd.

Polyanski is the elder brother of Igor Polyanski, also a professional triathlete, representing Saint-Raphaël Tri. In 2007 Dmitry married the Ukrainian professional triathlete Anastasiya née Yatsenko, with whom he lives in Penza. In 2011, Dmitry, his wife, his brother and Igor's girl friend Lyubov Ivanovskaya will represent Saint-Raphaël Triathlon in the Club Championship Series Lyonnaise des Eaux.

ITU Competitions 
In the seven years from 2005 to 2011, Dmitry Polyanski took part in 74 ITU triathlons and achieved 41 top ten positions, among which 15 medals.

The following list is based upon the official ITU rankings and the Athlete's Profile Page.
Unless indicated otherwise, all events are triathlons (Olympic Distance) and belong to the Elite category.

BG = the sponsor British Gas · DNF = did not finish · DNS = did not start

Notes

External links 
 Polyanski's ITU Profile Page

Russian male triathletes
1986 births
Living people
Olympic triathletes of Russia
Triathletes at the 2008 Summer Olympics
Triathletes at the 2012 Summer Olympics
Triathletes at the 2016 Summer Olympics
Triathletes at the 2015 European Games
European Games competitors for Russia
Triathletes at the 2020 Summer Olympics